Maviddapuram is a holy village in the Sri Lankan district of Jaffna under the Tellippalai divisional secretariat. It is near the Palali airport, Kankesanthurai harbour, and Keerimalai coast which is famous for the Naguleswaram Shiva temple. So, it is a centre point and well connected to Jaffna town by transport services before the late 1980s.

History of the name 
Ma means horse; vidda means removed; and puram is holy city. Maviddapuram is the holy city where the horse face of the Chola Princess Maruthapuraveegavalli changed to a human face when she prayed to Lord Naguleswara of Keerimalai and took bath in the holy theertha (water) of the temple with the advice of the Saint Nagula. This is the place where the famous Maviddapuram Kandaswamy Temple is found. The statue of the God Muruga is presented by the above the Chola princess, making it in her own country. The old name of the place is Kovil Kadavai, which was changed into Maviddapuram after the above event.

Agriculture and Industries 

Before 1990, Maviddapuram had a cement factory which was one of the major producers of cement in Sri Lanka. It also had aluminum-container producing factory. The soil is red so it is suited to the cultivation of beetles, mangoes and jack fruits. This place is not a producer of rice.

Transport 
 Maviddapuram railway station

 	

Villages in Jaffna District
Valikamam North DS Division